Prairie Land Regional Division No. 25 is a public school authority within the Canadian province of Alberta operated out of Hanna.

See also 
List of school authorities in Alberta

References

External links 

 
School districts in Alberta